Psalm 17 is the 17th psalm of the Book of Psalms, beginning in English in the King James Version: "Hear the right, O LORD, attend unto my cry". In the Greek Septuagint and the Latin Vulgate, it is psalm 16 in a slightly different numbering system, "Exaudi Domine iustitiam meam". Its authorship is traditionally assigned to King David.

The psalm forms a regular part of Jewish, Catholic, Lutheran, Anglican and other Protestant liturgies.

Text

Hebrew Bible version 
The following is the Hebrew text of Psalm 17:

King James Version 
 Hear the right, O LORD, attend unto my cry, give ear unto my prayer, that goeth not out of feigned lips.
 Let my sentence come forth from thy presence; let thine eyes behold the things that are equal.
 Thou hast proved mine heart; thou hast visited me in the night; thou hast tried me, and shalt find nothing; I am purposed that my mouth shall not transgress.
 Concerning the works of men, by the word of thy lips I have kept me from the paths of the destroyer.
 Hold up my goings in thy paths, that my footsteps slip not.
 I have called upon thee, for thou wilt hear me, O God: incline thine ear unto me, and hear my speech.
 Shew thy marvellous lovingkindness, O thou that savest by thy right hand them which put their trust in thee from those that rise up against them.
 Keep me as the apple of the eye, hide me under the shadow of thy wings,
 From the wicked that oppress me, from my deadly enemies, who compass me about.
 They are inclosed in their own fat: with their mouth they speak proudly.
 They have now compassed us in our steps: they have set their eyes bowing down to the earth;
 Like as a lion that is greedy of his prey, and as it were a young lion lurking in secret places.
 Arise, O LORD, disappoint him, cast him down: deliver my soul from the wicked, which is thy sword:
 From men which are thy hand, O LORD, from men of the world, which have their portion in this life, and whose belly thou fillest with thy hid treasure: they are full of children, and leave the rest of their substance to their babes.
 As for me, I will behold thy face in righteousness: I shall be satisfied, when I awake, with thy likeness. 

Commentator C. S. Rodd notes that the text is uncertain in a number of places, making the exact meaning doubtful, for example in verses 3, 4 and 14.

Analysis
Charles and Emilie Briggs summarize this psalm as follows: "Psalm 17 is a prayer for divine interposition on behalf of the righteous (v. 1-7). The psalmist has been tested by God in mind and conduct and approved (v. 3-4a); he has kept the divine ways and avoided wicked deeds (v. 4b-5), therefore he invokes God with confidence (v. 6a). He prays again that his Saviour may show kindness and keep him as the pupil of the eye (v. 6b-8a); that he may be sheltered from his greedy and arrogant enemies (v. 8b-10), who surround him to prey upon him (v. 11-12). Again he prays for divine interposition and deliverance by the slaying of the wicked (v. 13-14a); that penalty may be visited on them to the third generation, but that he himself may enjoy the divine presence (v. 14b-15)."

The Briggs believe Psalm 17 to have been written in the Persian period, after Zerubbabel but before Ezra's reforms, possibly by the same author as Psalm 16.

Uses

Judaism
Verse 2 is found in the repetition of the Amidah during Rosh Hashanah.
Verse 8 is part of the prayers of the Bedtime Shema.

Christianity
Verse 8, Keep me as the apple of the eye, hide me under the shadow of thy wings, is used in the office of Compline.
In the Church of England's Book of Common Prayer, Psalm 17 is appointed to be read on the morning of the third day of the month.

Musical settings 
Heinrich Schütz set Psalm 17 in a metred version in German, "Herr Gott, erhör die Grechtigkeit", SWV 113, as part of the Becker Psalter. Willy Burkhard composed in 1937 a setting for unison voices and organ, as his opus 49.The Irish hymn "mo ghrá Thu" is based on Psalm 17 [11]

References

11^https://www.lyricsondemand.com/a/aoifenifhearraighlyrics/moghrthsalm17lyrics.html

Sources

External links 

 
 
  in Hebrew and English - Mechon-mamre
 Text of Psalm 17 according to the 1928 Psalter
 A prayer of David. / Hear, LORD, my plea for justice; pay heed to my cry text and footnotes, usccb.org United States Conference of Catholic Bishops
 Psalm 17:1 introduction and text, biblestudytools.com
 Psalm 17 – Shelter Under the Shadow of His Wings enduringword.com
 Psalm 17 / Refrain: Deliver me, O Lord, by your hand. Church of England
 Psalm 17 at biblegateway.com
 Hymns for Psalm 17 hymnary.org

017
Works attributed to David